In mathematics, the big q-Legendre polynomials are an orthogonal family of polynomials defined in terms of Heine's basic hypergeometric series as

.

They obey the orthogonality relation

 

and have the limiting behavior

where  is the th Legendre polynomial.

References

Q-analogs
Orthogonal polynomials